Fragile Silence is a painting by graffiti artist Banksy. The  mural appears on the side of a trailer. Painted in 1998, a couple who owned a mobile trailer gave permission to Banksy to paint their home in exchange for two tickets to the Glastonbury Festival.

References

Works by Banksy